The World Surf League (WSL) is the governing body for professional surfers and is dedicated to showcasing the world's best talent in a variety of progressive formats. The World Surf League was originally known as the International Professional Surfing founded by Fred Hemmings and Randy Rarick in 1976. IPS created the first world circuit of pro surfing events. In 1983 the Association of Surfing Pros took over management of the world circuit. In 2013, the ASP was acquired by ZoSea, backed by Paul Speaker, Terry Hardy, and Dirk Ziff. At the start of the 2015 season, the ASP changed its name to the World Surf League. Sophie Goldschmidt was appointed as WSL CEO on 19 July 2017. Paul Speaker had stepped down as CEO on 11 January 2017, and Dirk Ziff acted as the interim WSL CEO until Goldschmidt's appointment.

As of December 2017, the WSL had more than 6.5 million Facebook fans, surpassing more established sports such as the National Hockey League, the Association of Tennis Professionals and Major League Soccer. Sports Business Journal reported that 28 million hours of WSL digital video content were consumed during the 2017 season, making WSL the third most watched sport online in United States behind NFL and NBA.

In January 2018, Forbes reported that the WSL had signed an exclusive deal for digital broadcast rights, with Facebook, worth $30 million over two years.

Erik Logan, Former Oprah Winfrey Network (OWN) President and Executive Vice President at Harpo Studios, was appointed as WSL CEO on 14 January 2020.

History

Predecessors 

 1964 to 1972, International Surfing Federation held the World Surfing Championships as a single event every two years and was open to all comers.
 1973 to 1975, Smirnoff World Pro-Am Surfing Championships, occasionally referred to as the de facto professional world championship. The International Surfing Federation had been unable to establish a format or sponsorship so no official amateur championships were held between 1973 and 1975.
 1976 to 1982, International Professional Surfers founded by Fred Hemmings and Randy Rarick was the original world governing body of professional surfing.

The predecessors of the  relates to what organization predominantly represented individual professional surfers at that time. This is an important point because the International Surfing Federation (ISF) still functions to this day as the International Surfing Association (ISA) and also refers to competition winners as world champions (or variants thereof).

The Association of Surfing Professionals (ASP) took over administration of professional surfing in 1983 and crowned world champions until 2015 when the organisation was rebranded as World Surf League (WSL).  The ASP/WSL has remained the predominant surfing organization and sanctioning body for professional surfers since its formation. The ASP's first world champions were Tom Carroll (men's) and Kim Mearig (women's) in 1983/84.  Split seasons were held from 1983/84 until 1988 when competition reverted to calendar basis.  This means that Damian Hardman and Wendy Botha were crowned ASP world Champions for 1987/88, while Barton Lynch and Freida Zamba were crowned ASP world champions for the (shortened) 1988 season.  The first WSL world champions were Adriano de Souza (BRA) and Carissa Moore (HAW) in 2015.

In March 2015, WSL launched a free downloadable app, which garnered more than a million downloads in its first year.  The app provides real-time updates on competitions and provides personalized alerts, letting fans know when their favorite athletes are about to enter the water.

In April 2016, the World Surf League introduced WSL PURE, its philanthropic initiative dedicated to supporting ocean health through research, education and advocacy.  WSL PURE has contributed an initial $1.5 million in funding that will support scientists from the Columbia University Lamont–Doherty Earth Observatory, as they lead research into ocean health & ecosystems, ocean acidification, sea-level rise, and the role the oceans play in climate change.

Equal pay for athletes in 2019 
On 5 September 2018, the World Surf League announced equal pay for every female and male WSL event. CEO Sophie Goldschmidt said, "This is a huge step forward in our long-planned strategy to elevate women's surfing and we are thrilled to make this commitment as we reveal our new 2019 schedule...". The announcement prompted a conversation about equal pay for professional athletes and the world commended the WSL for leading the way. 8 x world surfing champion Stephanie Gilmore said "I hope this serves as a model for other sports, global organizations and society as a whole. My fellow women athletes and I are honored by the confidence in us, and inspired to reward this decision with ever higher levels of surfing.".

COVID-19 impact 
On 14 March 2020 the WSL cancelled all events "for the remainder of March", including the opening event of the 2020 Championship Tour (CT) on the Gold Coast in Australia, and the Papara Pro Open. On 16 March the cancellations were extended to the end of May.

More events were cancelled in January 2021, Sunset, Big Wave Jaws Championship Pe’ahi and the Santa Cruz Pro.

WSL sanctioned tours 

 WSL Men's Championship Tour (CT)
 WSL Women's Championship Tour (CT)
 WSL Men's Challenger Series (CS)
 WSL Women's Challenger Series (CS)
 WSL Men's Qualifying Series (QS)
 WSL Women's Qualifying Series (QS)
 WSL Men's Longboard Championships
 WSL Women's Longboard Championships 
 WSL Junior Championships.
 WSL Big Wave Tour

WSL Championship tour

Event winners win a total of $100.000. Total prize pool per event in men's competition is $607.800 and for women's $420.800, as there are fewer competition spots available to the women. Event results are converted to points and count towards the World Title Race, the surfers with the most points by the end of the season are considered as world surfing champions.

The Men's Championship Tour (CT) is the men's elite competition consisting of the best 34 professional surfers competing in 11 events (as of 2015).

WSL Qualifying Series events 

Surfers who are not currently eligible for the Championship Tour (CT) events are able to compete in a Qualifying Series (QS) of events, earning points towards qualifying for the following year's CT. The top Qualifiers at the end of each season's QS receive invitations, with the exact number on invitations having changed slightly from season to season. Furthermore, if a particular CT event, in the current season, is short of CT competitors, the judges may choose to select from the then-current top ranked QS surfers to fill in for that eventthough this does not guarantee that the QS surfer will be invited to other events during the current season.

A WSL QS 10,000 event is held at premium venues with a restricted field and offers WSL QS 10,000 World Rankings points.

A WSL QS 1000, 1500, 3000 event is a lower level of competition, compared to an WSL QS 6000 and 10,000 event, with their importance indicated by how many points they are assigned: more points means generally better competition and prize money.

WSL world ranking 
WSL Men's Championship Tour and WSL Women's Championship Tour surfers accumulate points from each WSL Championship Tour and WSL Qualifying Series event they compete in which count towards their WSL World Ranking. Accumulated points are valid for 12 months from the final date of the scheduled event in which they were earned.

Promotion and relegation 

WSL World Ranking determines the promotion or relegation of surfers.

2012 tours
The qualifiers for the 2012 ASP World Tour top 34 surfers was determined using a Rotation Points system.

The qualifiers for the 2012 ASP Women's World Tour was determined by a surfer's rank at the conclusion of the 2011 Tour. The top 10 re-qualified for 2012 and the remaining 7 places were taken from the ASP Star Ranking.

2013-2018 tours
The qualifiers for the following year's WSL Men's Championship Tour top 34 surfers will consist of:
 Top 22 surfers from the previous season of the WSL World Title Rankings;
 Top 10 surfers from the previous season of the WSL World Qualifying Series (QS) Rankings (those who haven't already qualified in the above) and
 2 WSL wildcards.

Rules

Judging
In contests surfers are scored on a scale of 0.1 to 10.0. These scores are awarded in increments of one-tenth.
The following scale can be used to relate descriptions to the scores:

0–1.9 = Poor
2.0–3.9 = Fair
4.0–5.9 = Average 
6.0–7.9 = Good
8.0–10.0 = Excellent

Judging criteria
Judges base the score on how successfully surfers display the following elements in each wave:
 Commitment and degree of difficulty 
 Innovative and progressive maneuvers 
 Combination of major maneuvers 
 Variety of maneuvers 
 Speed, power and flow 
These elements may be weighted differently from day to day and event to event, depending on the surfing conditions and the type of breaking wave at each event location. These criteria are different from in longboarding competitions.  All is focused on creating some type consistency that can be seen throughout the many different events.

The events themselves are previously declared QS 1,000 - QS 10,000 events; among other things this ranking shows how many judges are required at the event. QS 1,000 - QS 3,000 Qualifying Series events are required to have a six judge panel with four judges on each heat. A QS 4,000 - QS 6,000 Qualifying Series event requires seven judges with five on each heat. At QS 5,000 - QS 10,000 Qualifying Series events there are only allowed to be 3 judges from any one region. This is then limited to two at any world championship events.  All events also require an WSL approved head judge who has the ability to make corrections to errors or any other events that may have affected the results.

Rules 
There are many rules out in the water that all revolve around the idea of right of way. A surfer has the right of way if he or she is closer to the area where the wave is breaking, this is more commonly referred to as having the inside position. If another surfer takes off in front of the surfer that has the inside position, then interference will be called, and penalties will be enacted. In most circumstances it does not matter who stood up first but who has the inside position.

A surfer can also be found guilty of interference if they catch more than their maximum number of waves in a heat and that this takes away from the other competitors ability to catch waves. A competitor is also not allowed to interfere with another competitor's paddling and maneuvering for a wave.

The rules of right of way vary slightly with the type of break. Point Breaks will always have a consistent direct of what is inside, that is, the person further up the line will have right of way. In a single peak situation where there is both a left and a right two people are able to be on the wave at the same time, provided that one goes left and one goes right and that neither crosses the path of the other to go one direction. If this does happen then, the surfer who stood up first will get the right of way. On a multi-peaked wave where the wave eventually comes together, both peaks can be surfed until the surfers come together. When they do the surfer who stood up first has right of way, and the other must maneuver to get off the wave without interrupting the other surfer.

In a one-on-one competition, priority can be declared by the Head Judge. Once the person with priority has paddled for a wave priority is then turned over to the next person until that person does the same. The person with second priority can paddle for waves as long as it does not interfere with the other person who will lose their priority only if they catch a wave.

A surfer who has already taken off or obtained possession of a wave maintains this position until the end of their ride. If another surfer takes off on the inside of this surfer, then this person does not obtain priority and is considered to be snaking. If this surfer does not hurt the other surfers ride, then both people can be scored based. If the judges determine that the snaking did interfere then the person will be penalized. 
Interference penalties are called by the judges and must have a majority to be declared an actual penalty. Interference are shown as triangles on the score cards in various different ways depending on when or where in the heat they were made. If three or more waves are being scored than one wave will be dropped off the score card. If only the top two waves are being scored, then 50% of the second best-scored wave will be taken off. If a surfer has more than one then 50% of the best waves score will be taken off also. The surfer who has been interfered with will be allowed an additional wave to their maximum as long as it is within the time limit. If a surfer interferes more than twice in a heat then they must leave the competition area.

WSL Championship Tour champions

Annual Championship Tour champions, since 1964, as recorded by World Surf League and correct as of 8 September 2022.

WSL Longboard Championship Tour champions
Annual Longboard champions, since Men's event started in 1986/87 and Women's in 1999, as recorded by World Surf League and correct as of 5 October 2022.

WSL World Junior champions
Annual Junior champions, since Men's event started in 1998 and Women's in 2005, as recorded by the Association of Surfing Pros through to 2012.

WSL Big Wave Tour champions

Men's Triple Crown Champions

NOTE:  Only one event of the 2020 Triple Crown was held because of the pandemic.

Top Nations

See also

 The International Surfing Association, an international surfing authority with 86 current members, including the United States and Australia.  Throughout 2015, the ISA attempted to reach 100 members to bring surfing to the Olympic Games. On August 3, 2016, the International Olympic Committee (IOC) confirmed surfing as an event at the Tokyo 2020 Olympic Games. 
 Quiksilver Pro Gold Coast
 Rip Curl Pro
 Billabong Pro Teahupoo
 Quiksilver Pro France
 Billabong Pipeline Masters
 Roxy Pro Gold Coast
 World Surf League Australasia
 World Surf League Europe
 MEO Rip Curl Pro Portugal

References

External links

 
Surfing competitions
Companies based on the Gold Coast, Queensland
Surfing in Australia
Multinational companies headquartered in Australia
Surfing organizations
Sports competition series